James A. Brown was manager of the group within IBM responsible for the programming language APL2 program product. APL2 was first available on IBM mainframe computers in 1980, and was later available under Linux, Unix, and Windows. In 1993, Brown received the Kenneth E. Iverson Award for Outstanding Contribution to APL from the Association for Computing Machinery.

In 1996, he left IBM to become a consultant and entrepreneur. In 1999, Brown cofounded SmartArrays, Inc., and has held a senior position in the company for many years. The firm develops specialized analytic software based on columnar databases, with memory-resident vector processing, for uses where customers consider commercial off-the-shelf software to be more expensive, slow, or limited.

References

External links

American computer scientists
Computer systems researchers
Programming language researchers
IBM employees
APL implementers
Living people
1943 births